The men's 3x3 basketball tournament at the 2019 Pan American Games in Lima, Peru was held between 27 and 29 July 2019. It was won by the United States who defeated the Puerto Rico by two points in the final. Dominican Republic got the bronze.

Qualification 
Teams were entered based on their FIBA Ranking. Host nation Peru was barred from participating following sanctions imposed on the Peruvian Basketball Federation.

Rosters

Results

Preliminary round

Fifth place match

Medal round

Semifinals

Bronze medal match

Gold medal match

References

Mens